Coke Studio is an Indian music television series that presents live musical performances by different artists recorded in the studio. The program showcases a variety of music genres from the Indian subcontinent, including Hindustani, Carnatic, Indian folk, as well as contemporary hip hop, rock, and pop music. The concept of the show draws inspiration from the Pakistani version of the same name.

Coke Studio @ MTV

Season 1 (2011) 

Each hour-long episode of the Coke Studio At MTV featured six songs and a diverse mix of music from alternative genres including Carnatic and Hindustani, compositions by new musicians, recreated Bollywood tracks, and a special song created on the programme.

Season 2 (2012) 

Coke Studio India 2 began airing on 6 July 2012 and concluded on 25 August 2012. The season featured 8 episodes.

Season 3 (2013) 

Season 3 featured 13 music producers. The season began airing on 1 August 2013 and concluded on 7 October 2013. A total of 47 songs were released in the span of three months.

Season 4 (2015) 

Season 4 began airing on 1 March 2015 and concluded on 4 October 2015. The season featured 6 episodes, a total of 17 songs, released in the span of six months.

Coke Studio Tamil

Season 1 (2023)

Coke Studio Bharat

Season 1 (2023)

See also 
 MTV Unplugged
 Coke Studio Pakistan
 Coke Studio Bangla

Notes and references

Notes

References

External links 
 
 

DD National original programming
Indian music television series
MTV (Indian TV channel) original programming
Indian television series based on non-Indian television series
Lists of Indian television series episodes